Takha is a village in the Etawah district Uttar Pradesh. It is also a Sub-Division (Tehsil) and Block (Kshetra Panchayat) of the Etawah district.

Geography
Takha is a block and a tehsil.

Takha Tehsil Etawah

 Takha is a subdistrict

Transport
Roads

Takha has good road connection to the Agra Lucknow Expressway. Takha Tehsil Bus Stand is served by Takha UPSRTC Services

Railway

Takha has no railway station.  Nearby stations are Etawah Junction railway station & Ekdil

Airport

Saifai airstrip is only  from the village and provides connectivity to Delhi, Nearby International Airport is Taj International Airport Jewar Uttar Pradesh

Education
Schools & Colleges in Takha are either government run schools or private schools . The schools are affiliated to the All-India Indian Certificate of Secondary Education (ICSE) or the Central Board of Secondary Education (CBSE) boards.

 Jila Panchayat School Usrahar 
 Usrahar Public School

Demographic
As of the 2011 census the population was 10,969 of which 5,942 were male and 5,027 female. The population of children between age 0-6 was 1674 which was 15.26% of the total population.

References

Villages in Etawah district